Carolyn Hill is a golfer.

Carolyn or Caroline Hill may also refer to:

Carly Hill, Canadian ice hockey player
Carolyn Hill (Under the Dome), fictional character
Caroline Hill, English actress
Caroline S. Hill, British scientist

 Caroline Hill, a hill near So Kon Po, Hong Kong Island